Groupe Air Sénégal, operating as Senegal Airlines, was an airline with its head office on the property of Léopold Sédar Senghor International Airport in Dakar, Senegal. It operated a scheduled network in Senegal and neighbouring countries from its main base at Léopold Sédar Senghor International Airport.

History
The airline was launched after Air Sénégal International ceased its operations in 2009, and made its first flights on 25 January 2011. Senegal Airlines's CEO was Edgardo Badiali, the former CEO  of GoAir and MyAir. It was 64% privately owned.

On 12 April 2016, Senegal's Minister of Economy, Finance and Planning, Amadou Ba, announced that Senegal Airlines had formally ceased all operations. Senegal Airlines was shut down because it had accumulated over 100 billion CFA francs ($172 million US dollars) of debt since its inception. Senegal plans to establish a new flag carrier in the near future.

On 14 May 2018, Air Senegal was launched to replace it.

Destinations 
Senegal Airlines offered service to the following African cities before ceasing operations in April 2016:

Africa
Benin
Cotonou - Cotonou Airport
Burkina Faso
Ouagadougou - Ouagadougou Airport
Cameroon
Douala - Douala Airport
Cape Verde
Praia - Praia Airport
Ivory Coast
Abidjan - Port Bouet Airport
Gabon
Libreville - Libreville International Airport
Gambia
Banjul - Banjul International Airport
Guinea
Conakry - Gbessia Airport
Guinea-Bissau
Bissau - Osvaldo Vieira International Airport
Mali
Bamako - Senou International Airport
Mauritania
Nouakchott - Nouakchott International Airport
Niger
Niamey - Niamey Airport
Senegal
Cap Skirring - Cap Skirring Airport
Dakar - Léopold Sédar Senghor International Airport Hub
Ziguinchor - Ziguinchor Airport

Fleet 

Senegal Airlines operated the following aircraft until operations terminated in April 2016:

References

External links

 Official website 

Defunct airlines of Senegal
Airlines established in 2011
Airlines disestablished in 2016
2009 establishments in Senegal
2016 disestablishments in Senegal